A list of notable flat horse races which take place annually in Germany, including all conditions races which currently hold Group 1, 2 or 3 status in the European Pattern.

Group 1

Group 2

Group 3

Former Group races

Discontinued

References
 tjcis.com – Flat races in Germany, 2012.

 Flat 
 Flat
Horse racing-related lists